Milford Crossroads is an unincorporated community in New Castle County, Delaware, United States. Milford Crossroads is located along Delaware Route 72, at the intersection of Possum Park Road/Thompson Station Road and Paper Mill Road, northeast of Newark.

References

Unincorporated communities in New Castle County, Delaware
Unincorporated communities in Delaware